WMSB may refer to:

 WMSB (FM), a radio station (88.9 FM) in Byhalia, Mississippi
 WLRK (FM), a radio station (91.5 FM) in Greenville, Mississippi, which held the call sign WMSB in 2003
 WKAR-TV a television station in East Lansing, Michigan, which held the call sign WMSB from 1959 to 1972